Osama Elsamni (Erusamunī Osama; ; born 29 September 1988) is an Egyptian-Japanese retired footballer who played as a striker.

Career

Tokyo Verdy

Having emerged from Tokyo Verdy youth playing alongside his older brother Ali.  Osama was the top scorer of the Japanese Youth Championship. He was soon called up to train with the first team, where he was given the No.32 shirt. Despite not making an actual appearance for Verdy, his performances at youth and academy level attracted interest from across the globe. With FK Teplice, Portuguese outfit Belenenses leading the chase. After trials at both clubs, he went to FK Teplice.

FK Teplice

In February 2009, Elsamni signed for Gambrinus Liga side FK Teplice.

Elsamni made his debut in the 3–0 win against FC Viktoria Plzeň on 8 March 2009, where he assisted the third goal.

Elsamni scored his first goal for FK Teplice when they defeated FK Ústí nad Labem in the Czech Cup on 3 September. The game ended in a 4–1 win for Teplice. Elsamni came as a substitute in the 83rd minute, and scored after three minutes on pitch.

By the end of 2009–2010 season, Elsamni has scored 8 goals for FK Teplice B, and 1 goal for FK Teplice first team.

In June 2010, Elsamni terminated his contract with FK Teplice. He was then linked with a possible transfer to Egyptian giants Zamalek, but negotiations reached a closed end.

Montedio Yamagata

Osama joined Japanese side Montedio Yamagata in January 2011. "I can score goals with my left, right feet or head. I improved my physical strength in the Czech Republic. I'm confident of scoring," Elsamni said. He was released in January 2012.

YSCC Yokohama
On 16 August 2012, Elsamni joined Japan Football League side YSCC Yokohama. He made his debut in the Emperor's Cup on 2 September 2012 against Vanraure Hachinohe.

Club statistics
Updated to 20 November 2016.

Czech Republic

Japan

Honours
 Czech Cup: 2008–09

International career
Elsamni revealed in May 2009 his interest in representing Egypt.

Personal life
Elsamni is from a sporting family; his older brother Ali Elsamni is also a footballer, and his father Ibrahim was a player in Egypt national football team.

References

External links

 Osama Elsamni official website 
 Player profile on Montedio Yamagata official club website 
 Player profile on FK Teplice official website 
 

1988 births
Living people
Association football people from Okinawa Prefecture
Japanese footballers
Egyptian footballers
J1 League players
J2 League players
J3 League players
Japan Football League players
Czech First League players
Tokyo Verdy players
FK Teplice players
Montedio Yamagata players
YSCC Yokohama players
Japanese expatriate footballers
Egyptian expatriate footballers
Expatriate footballers in the Czech Republic
Association football forwards
Egyptian people of Japanese descent
Japanese people of Egyptian descent